"New York City" is a 1975 single by the British glam rock band T. Rex. The track and its B-side "Chrome Sitar", are taken from the 1976 album Futuristic Dragon. The song consists of a couple of lines of lyric, "Did you ever see a woman coming out of New York City/With a frog in her hand?" and "I did don't you know/And don't it show?" repeated over a bass line.

The single was released on 27 June 1975, and was in the UK charts for a total of eight weeks, peaking at No. 15.

In some countries, the B-side was "Solid Baby" taken from the previous album "Bolan's Zip Gun".

References

1975 singles
T. Rex (band) songs
Songs written by Marc Bolan
Song recordings produced by Marc Bolan
EMI Records singles
1975 songs